Itene (Moré) is a Chapacuran language of Bolivia.

See also
 Wariʼ language, the only vibrant language in the same language family, spoken in Rondônia, Brazil
 Coordinadora de las Naciones Indígenas del Mamoré Occidental

References

Chapacuran languages
Endangered Chapacuran languages